Natalia Avelon ( Siwek; born 29 March 1980) is a German actress and singer of Polish descent.

Biography 
Avelon was born Natalia Siwek on 29 March 1980 in Wrocław, Poland. When she was eight years old, she moved to Germany with her parents.

She played 1960s sex symbol Uschi Obermaier in Achim Bornhak's 2007 film Eight Miles High.

Avelon performed with HIM lead singer Ville Valo the duet of Lee Hazlewood's song "Summer Wine", which is part of the Eight Miles High soundtrack.

Filmography

Television 
Der Club der grünen Witwen (2001) – Kerstin Riemer
Prinz und Paparazzi (2005)

Television series
Rosa Roth – Geschlossene Gesellschaft (2002) – Simone
Zwei Engel auf Streife – Wodka auf Ex (2002) – Tatjana
Bewegte Männer – Die Oberweitenreform (2005) – Jenny
Der Bulle von Tölz – Süsse Versuchung (2003) – Verkäuferin
Sturm der Liebe – (2005)
Ein Fall für zwei – Die schöne Tote (2005) – Dunja
Tatort – Tod einer Heuschrecke (2008)Strike Back: Project Dawn (2011) – Lieutenant Marianna Schekter

Music videos 
Money and Women – Wyn Davies (2012) with Heike Makatsch, Karoline Schuch, Rolf Eden

References

External links 

1980 births
Living people
German film actresses
Actors from Wrocław
Polish emigrants to Germany
21st-century German women singers